The 1924 Richmond Spiders football team was an American football team that represented the University of Richmond as an independent during the 1924 college football season. Led by 11th-year head coach, Frank Dobson, Richmond compiled a record of 2–6–1.

Schedule

References

Richmond
Richmond Spiders football seasons
Richmond Spiders football